State Highway 57 (SH 57) is a short,  state highway in Kit Carson County, Colorado, United States, that connects Interstate 70 (I‑70), south of Stratton with U.S. Route 24 (US 24) in Stratton.

Route description
SH 57 begins at a diamond interchange with I‑70 (I‑70 Exit 419) just south of Stratton. I‑70 heads west toward Vona, Limon, and Denver and east toward Bethune, Burlington, and eventually, Hays, Kansas. County Road 30.5 heads very briefly south before ending shortly after a connection with the north end of County Road 31 [CR 31]--the former routing of SR 57.) From its southern terminus, SH 57 heads northward for about  before the city limits of Stratton. SH 57 quickly crosses Claremont Street/Seventh Street, followed by Sixth and Fifth streets, before reaching an intersection with US 24 (Fourth Street), its northern terminus. (US 24 heads east toward Bethune and Burlington and west toward Vona, Seibert, and Limon. Colorado Avenue continues north to CR 30.5.)

The route is entirely unsigned; there are no signs designating the route as SH 57. However, the Colorado Department of Transportation (CDOT) still recognizes it as a state highway and maintains it as needed.

Traffic
As of 2021, approximately 2000 cars used the route daily.

History
The route was established in the 1920s. It began at US 24 in Stratton and headed north to Kirk and on to U.S. Route 36. This entire remaining length was paved by 1956. The highway was linked to I‑70 in 1966 when the Interstate Highway System was built, and the  stretch north of US 24 was removed from the numbered route in 1992, leaving the approximately  routing seen today.

Major intersections

See also

 List of state highways in Colorado

References

External links

057
Transportation in Kit Carson County, Colorado
State highways in the United States shorter than one mile